The Holland Theatre was a movie theater that operated in Bellefontaine, Ohio, United States.  Like many historic theaters, the Holland ultimately went out of business after a newer, more technologically advanced cinema, was introduced to the town.

History 
Built in 1931, the Holland Theatre was designed by Peter Hulsken, a Dutch immigrant to Lima, Ohio. Construction was completed by the Hossler Brothers of Tiffin, Ohio for the cost of $150,000. 

The exterior has a Flemish-style stepped-gable facade and uses Dutch cross bond brick. In the interior, the lobby has a beamed ceiling, slate floors, and rough walls. The foyer contains a 17th-century Dutch landscape that lined both interior sidewalls of the theater including windmills that slowly turned modeled after his hometown of Arnhem, Holland.  Individuals associated with the theater believe that it is the only atmospheric theater in the United States built in a primarily Dutch style of architecture. 

The Holland originally had the capability for both cinema and stage plays but was eventually converted to a 5 screen multiplex, with the "main" screen remaining in the auditorium in front of the stage after it was sold in 1977. The theater's balcony was split in half and converted into two screens, and two additional screens were constructed in the rear of the cinema where the stage previously existed.

In 1998, the multiplex closed and a 6th grade class made the theatre its class project to raise awareness. Richard Knowlton, a Bellefontaine businessman bought it, later donating the theatre to the Logan County Landmark Preservation. As the preservation group worked to restore the building, various fine arts events continued to be hosted. In 2010, the theater received a grant from the Ohio Cultural Facilities Commission; the theater board has installed a new lighting system with the grant money. More grant money was acquired in 2015 and 2019. The renovations were completed in October 2019 with singer Judy Collins opening.

References

External links
Theater website

Cinemas and movie theaters in Ohio
1931 establishments in Ohio
1998 disestablishments in Ohio
Buildings and structures in Logan County, Ohio
Bellefontaine, Ohio
Theatres on the National Register of Historic Places in Ohio
National Register of Historic Places in Logan County, Ohio